A curve is a geometrical object in mathematics.

Curve(s) may also refer to:

Arts, entertainment, and media

Music
 Curve (band), an English alternative rock music group
 Curve (album), a 2012 album by Our Lady Peace
 "Curve" (song), a 2017 song by Gucci Mane featuring The Weeknd
 Curve, a 2001 album by Doc Walker
 "Curve", a song by John Petrucci from Suspended Animation, 2005
 "Curve", a song by Cam'ron from the album Crime Pays, 2009

Periodicals
 Curve (design magazine), an industrial design magazine
 Curve (magazine), a U.S. lesbian magazine

Other uses in arts, entertainment, and media
 Curve (film), a 2015 film
 BBC Two 'Curve' idents, various animations based around a curve motif

Brands and enterprises
Curve (payment card), a payment card that aggregates multiple payment cards
 Curve (theatre), a theatre in Leicester, United Kingdom
 Curve, fragrance by Liz Claiborne
 BlackBerry Curve, a series of phones from Research in Motion
 Curves International, an international fitness franchise

Other uses
 Curve (tonality), a software technique for image manipulation
 Curveball, a baseball pitch often called simply a "curve"
 Female body shape or curves
 French curve, a template made out of plastic, metal or wood used to draw smooth curves
 Grading curve, a system of grading students
 Yield curve, a representation of predicted value of a fixed income security for different durations

See also 
Curvature
Flat spline, a very flexible rule used to draw curves
The Curve (disambiguation)